The 2019 Boston College Eagles women's soccer team represented Boston College during the 2019 NCAA Division I women's soccer season.  The Eagles were led by head coach Jason Lowe, in his first season.  They played home games at Newton Campus Soccer Field.  This is the team's 39th season playing organized women's college soccer, and their 15th playing in the Atlantic Coast Conference.

The Eagles finished the season 8–8–2 overall, and 1–8–1 in ACC play to finish in fourteenth place.  They did not qualify for the ACC Tournament and were not invited to the NCAA Tournament.

Squad

Roster

Updated October 8, 2020

Team management

Source:

Schedule

Source:

|-
!colspan=6 style=""| Exhibition

|-
!colspan=6 style=""| Non-Conference Regular season

|-
!colspan=6 style=""| ACC Regular season

Rankings

References

Boston College
Boston College Eagles women's soccer seasons
2019 in sports in Massachusetts